A constitutional referendum was held in Madagascar on 25 March 1998. The proposed amendments would allow the president to dissolve parliament, and divide the country into six provinces. It was narrowly approved by just 50.96% of voters, with a 70% turnout.

Results

References

Referendums in Madagascar
Madagascar
Constitutional referendum
Constitutional referendums in Madagascar
Malagasy constitutional referendum